Thue's theorem may refer to the following mathematical theorems named after Axel Thue:
 Thue equation has finitely many solutions in integers.
 Thue's lemma, which asserts that every modular integer may be written as a modular fraction with numerator and denominator bounded by the square root of the modulus.
 Thue–Siegel–Roth theorem, also known as Roth's theorem, is a foundational result in diophantine approximation to algebraic numbers.
 The 2-dimensional analog of Kepler's conjecture: the regular hexagonal packing is the densest circle packing in the plane (1890).